Akshayavata, also rendered Akshayavat, is a sacred fig tree mentioned in the Hindu mythology. It is also the name of a sacred lake mentioned in the Puranas.

Legend 
The Padma Purana states that those who venerate the Akshayavata with devotion are freed from sins.

The Akshayavata is mentioned as a holy site of Gaya in the Mahabharata.

According to legend, once, the sage Markandeya asked Narayana to show him a taste of his divine power. Narayana caused a pralaya, flooding the entire world for a moment, during which only the Akshayavata could be seen above the water level.

According to regional tradition, the emperor Jahangir cut the Akshayavata to its roots and hammered a red-hot iron cauldron on its stump so that it doesn't grow again. However, within a year, the tree began to grow again.

Identification  

A tree in Prayagraj has been described as Akshayavata in the Prayag Mahatmya of the Matsya Purana.

In The Encyclopaedia Asiatica (1976), Edward Balfour identifies a banyan tree mentioned in Ramayana with the tree at Prayag. Rama, Lakshmana, and Sita are said to have rested beneath this tree. The Chinese Buddhist pilgrim Xuanzang mentions a tree (a stump with few branches) which was said to be the home of a man-eating demon. As part of a custom, some pilgrims would offer themselves at the nearby temple. Xuanzang mentions that the tree was surrounded by human bones. Alexander Cunningham identified this tree with the Akshayavata at Prayag. Rishabha (Jain tirthankar) is also said to have practised tapasya beneath the historical Akshayavata at Prayag.

Currently, a sacred fig tree located within the Patalpuri Temple at the Prayagraj Fort is worshipped as the Akshayavata described in ancient texts. , a permission from the Commandant of Prayagraj Fort's Ordnance Depot is needed to visit this tree. On one day during the Kumbh Mela, the site is open to all the pilgrims. However, a popular opinion is that the Patalpuri Temple tree is not the authentic Akshayavata: the real Akshayavata is in another underground temple inside the Fort. When the British gained control of the Prayagraj Fort after the Treaty of Prayagraj in 1765, they did not want general public to access the sensitive parts of the fort. So, the shrine was moved to the fringes of the fort compound, that is, the present-day Patalpuri Temple. According to the Welsh travel writer Fanny Parkes, who visited both the tree sites in 1831, when the original Akshayavata chamber was closed, the local Brahmins set up the stump of a ber tree in Patalpuri. They claimed that it was a branch of the original Akshayavata that had penetrated through the walls. Parkes states that the local Hindus of Prayag knew about this and did not worship the false Akshayavata. An 18th-century map of the Fort from the British Library confirms this: the location of the original temple is shown in the center of the fort; while the present-day Patalpuri Temple is on the outskirts of the Fort. In the 1950s, Shiva Nath Katju also claimed that the "tree" placed in the Patalpuri Temple was only a log that was replaced by the priests every 4–5 years. The commander of the fort acknowledged his claim as true.

A tree at Gaya, Bihar and another tree at Varanasi are also worshipped as the Akshayavata. The Bodhi tree is said to be a manifestation of the Akashayavat at Prayag.

According to Tibetan Buddhist tradition, Buddha is said to have planted a seed of the Prayag's Akshayavata next to Mount Kailash on a mountain known as the Palace of the Medicine Buddha.

See also 

 Ashvattha, mythological world tree
 Kalpavriksha, a mythological, wish-fulfilling divine tree

References 

Sacred trees in Hinduism
Tourist attractions in Allahabad
Hindu mythology
Trees in mythology
Individual banyan trees